Mikhaylovskaya is a rural locality (a village) in Yavengskoye Rural Settlement, Vozhegodsky District, Vologda Oblast, Russia. The population was 125 as of 2002.

Geography 
Mikhaylovskaya is located 28 km northeast of Vozhega (the district's administrative centre) by road. Belavinskaya is the nearest rural locality.

References 

Rural localities in Vozhegodsky District